Ingeborg Kühler (born 25 May 1943, in Dachau, Bavaria) is a German architect, engineer and university lecturer. She was the first female design professor at a West German architecture faculty and designed the plans for the Technoseum in Mannheim.

She lives in Berlin.

Works (selection) 

 1983–1889: Studio of the South German Radio in Mannheim
 1983–1990: State Museum for Technology and Work "Technoseum" in Mannheim, 1990
 1990–2001: Residence in Berlin-Kladow, 2001
 2008: 1st exhibition of drawings and watercolors

Awards 

 Förderungspreis des Kunstpreises Berlin for the field of architecture, together with the garden and landscape architect Dirk Jürgen Zilling, 1986
 European Award for Museum Design, 1992, for the "Technoseum" State Museum of Technology and Labor
 BDA Award for Good Buildings, 1990
 German Steel Construction Award, recognition
 30 September 2017 – 8 March 2018, FRAU ARCHITEKT: In the film and exhibition at the German Architecture Museum in Frankfurt and in the catalog for the exhibition FRAU ARCHITEKT.

Literature 

 Karin Wilhelm: "Das Auge wandert mit": Die Architektin Ingeborg Kuhler. In: Mary Pepchinski et al. (eds.): Frau Architekt. Seit mehr als 100 Jahren: Frauen im Architektenberuf. Wasmuth, Tübingen 2017, ISBN 978-3-8030-0829-9, p. 221–225, 299.

References 

1943 births
Living people
People from Dachau
20th-century German architects
Engineers from Bavaria